The Leyenda de Plata (2005) was professional wrestling tournament produced by the Mexican wrestling promotion Consejo Mundial de Lucha Libre (CMLLl; Spanish "World Wrestling Council") that ran from October 28, 2005, over the course of three of CMLL's Friday night shows in Arena México with the finals on November 11, 2005. The annual Leyenda de Plata tournament is held in honor of lucha libre legend El Santo and is one of CMLL's most important annual tournaments.

The 2005 Leyenda de Plata is the only tournament to not feature the previous year's champion defending the trophy intentionally, playing off Aguayo's breaking of the trophy the previous year. The lack of defending champion forced CMLL to change the format of the Leyenda de Plata as they held two eight-man torneo cibernetico elimination matches instead of one 16-man, with the winner of each cibernetico facing each other the following week. The two cibernetico format has been the standard tournament format for the Leyenda de Plata ever since 2005. The first cibernetico took place on October 28, 2005 and featured  El Hijo del Santo, Hombre Sin Nombre, La Máscara, Volador Jr., Misterioso Jr., Jado, Averno and Negro Casas. The match came down to Hijo del Santo and Casas and initially ended in a double pin. After the match was restarted El Hijo del Santo won by submission. The second cibernetico took place on November 4 and saw Atlantis outlast a field that also included Místico, Último Dragón, Máxmio, El Sagrado, Mephisto, Hijo de Pierroth and Gedo. On November 11, 2005, Atlantis defeated El Hijo del Santo with help from his corner-man Último Guerrero to win the seventh Leyenda de Plata.

Production

Background
The Leyenda de Plata (Spanish for "the Silver Legend") is an annual lucha libre tournament scripted and promoted by the Mexican professional wrestling promotion Consejo Mundial de Lucha Libre (CMLL).  The first Leyenda de Plata was held in 1998 and was in honor of El Santo, nicknamed Enmáscarado de Plata (the Silver mask) from which the tournament got its name. The trophy given to the winner is a plaque with a metal replica of the mask that El Santo wore in both wrestling and lucha films.

The Leyenda de Plata was held annually until 2003, at which point El Santo's son, El Hijo del Santo left CMLL on bad terms. The tournament returned in 2004 and has been held on an almost annual basis since then. The original format of the tournament was the Torneo cibernetico elimination match to qualify for a semi-final. The winner of the semi-final would face the winner of the previous year's tournament in the final. Since 2005 CMLL has held two cibernetico matches and the winner of each then meet in the semi-final. In 2011, the tournament was modified to eliminate the final stage as the previous winner, Místico, did not work for CMLL at that point in time The 2005 edition of La Leyenda de Plata was the seventh overall tournament held by CMLL.

Storylines
The events featured a total of number of professional wrestling matches with different wrestlers involved in pre-existing scripted feuds, plots and storylines. Wrestlers were portrayed as either heels (referred to as rudos in Mexico, those that portray the "bad guys") or faces (técnicos in Mexico, the "good guy" characters) as they followed a series of tension-building events, which culminated in a wrestling match or series of matches.

Tournament overview

Cibernetico 1

Cibernetico 2

Results

October 28, 2005
C

November 4, 2005

November 11, 2005

References

2005 in professional wrestling
Leyenda de Plata
Events in Mexico City
November 2005 events in Mexico